Buenos días, Acapulco is a 1964 Mexican comedy film starring Viruta and Capulina.

External links

Mexican comedy films
1960s Mexican films